Shepherds and Butchers is a 2016 South African drama film directed by Oliver Schmitz. It was shown in the Panorama section at the 66th Berlin International Film Festival. It is an adaptation of the debut novel of the same name by Chris Marnewick, a New Zealand-based author and former South African High Court barrister and judge.

Plot
Nearing the end of apartheid in South Africa, a young white prison guard (Garion Dowds) embarks on a seemingly motiveless shooting that sees to the death of seven unarmed black men. A British-born lawyer assigned to his case (Steve Coogan) sets out to prove his actions were a direct result of psychological trauma from his volatile work environment. The defense attorney is an ardent opponent of the death penalty.

Cast
 Steve Coogan as John Weber - Defence attorney
 Andrea Riseborough as Kathleen Marais - Prosecutor
 Garion Dowds as Leon Labuschagne - Defendant
 Deon Lotz as Warrant Officer Rautenbach - Prison officer
 Marcel van Heerden as Justice J. P. van Zyl - Chief Judge
 Robert Hobbs as Pierre De Villiers - John's Brother-in-law

Awards
The film received third place in the Panorama Audience Award at the 66th Berlin International Film Festival.

References

External links
 
 

2016 films
2016 drama films
2010s English-language films
English-language South African films
South African drama films
South African crime drama films
Films directed by Oliver Schmitz
Films about capital punishment
Apartheid films
Courtroom films